The Moscow Millionaire Fair held in Moscow, Russia is an annual fair for Russian millionaires. The Millionaire Fair was organized in 2002 by Gijrath Media Group B. V.,  the publishing house which issues magazines for the rich and famous such as Millionaire and Jackie.

The Exhibition in Moscow is organized in co-operation with publishing house Independent Media Sanoma Magazines (newspapers Vedomosti, The Moscow Times, Na rublevke, magazines Harper’s Bazaar, Robb Report, Esquire, Cosmopolitan, FHM and many others).
The Millionaire Fair was founded four years ago in Amsterdam as an event for advertisers and readers of the Miljonair magazine. Since then, the Millionaire Fair became a landmark in the luxury event calendars. In September 2005 Independent Media Sanoma Magazines and GMG Events B. V. organized this event for the first time in Russia.

The Fair is open for everyone to enjoy, but obviously it is the millionaires who will be making the grand purchases and filling the event. The event is usually strict-dress coded and entrance is invitation only. Tickets can be purchased prior to the event.
The attractions this year included a $1 million phone encrusted in diamonds, the choice to buy a house on an island, or the island itself and £25,000 perfumes. Millionaire Fair Moscow 2007 opened on 22 November 2007 at Crocus Expo.

The fair went on hiatus in 2020.

References

External links
 Official website
 BBC Pictures of Event

Annual fairs
Economy of Moscow
Fairs in Russia